Vincenzo della Marra, C.R.L. (1645 – 27 Apr 1712) was a Roman Catholic prelate who served as Bishop of Alessano (1695–1712).

Biography
Vincenzo della Marra was born in 1645 in Naples, Italy and ordained a priest in the Canons Regular of the Congregation of the Most Holy Saviour of the Lateran. On 16 May 1695, he was appointed during the papacy of Pope Innocent XII as Bishop of Alessano. On 23 May 1695, he was consecrated bishop by Ferdinando d'Adda, Cardinal-Priest of San Clemente, with Carolus de Tilly, Bishop of Acerra, and Sebastiano Perissi, Bishop of Nocera de' Pagani, serving as co-consecrators. He served as Bishop of Alessano until his death on 27 April 1712.

References

External links and additional sources
 (for Chronology of Bishops) 
 (for Chronology of Bishops) 

17th-century Italian Roman Catholic bishops
18th-century Italian Roman Catholic bishops
1645 births
1712 deaths
Bishops appointed by Pope Innocent XII
Canons Regular of the Lateran